MIS or mis may refer to:

Science and technology
 Management information system
 Marine isotope stage, stages of the Earth's climate
 Maximal independent set, in graph theory
 Metal-insulator-semiconductor, e.g., in MIS capacitor
 Minimally invasive surgery, surgical techniques with limited incision sizes
 Müllerian inhibiting substance or Anti-Müllerian hormone, a developmental glycoprotein
 Multi Interface Shoe, a Sony camera hotshoe
 Multisystem inflammatory syndrome, a class of medical conditions

Organizations
 Maritime Internet Services Inc.
 Military Intelligence Service (United States), WWII Japanese translation unit
 Movement for the Independence of Sicily

Schools
 The Mother's International School, New Delhi, India
 Manado Independent School, Indonesia
 Melaka International School, Malaysia
 Myanmar International School, Myanmar
 Munich International School, Starnberg

Speedways
 Madison International Speedway, Wisconsin, US
 Michigan International Speedway, Michigan, US

Other uses
 Master of International Studies
 Teddy Bear (1980 film), a 1980 Polish film directed by Stanisław Bareja, Polish title Miś
 mis, ISO 639-2 and ISO 639-3 three-letter language code for uncoded languages
 Mexican Institute of Sound, a musical group in Mexico City
 Misima Island Airport (IATA code)